Tha Chang may refer to:

Amphoe
There are two amphoe named Tha Chang in Thailand, which, however, have two different Thai spellings. It could refer to:
Amphoe Tha Chang, Surat Thani Province (ท่าฉาง)
Amphoe Tha Chang, Sing Buri Province (ท่าช้าง)
Amphoe Ban Lat, Phetchaburi Province, was named Tha Chang (ท่าช้าง) till 1939
Amphoe Chakkarat, Nakhon Ratchasima Province, was named Tha Chang (ท่าช้าง) till 1953

Other
 Tha Chang subdistrict in Phrom Phiram, Phitsanulok 
Tha Chang Pier, pier on Chao Phraya River in Phra Nakhon District, Bangkok

See also
 List of tambon in Thailand – T
 Chang (disambiguation)